The 2019–20 Liga IV Sibiu was the 52nd season of the Liga IV Sibiu, the fourth tier of the Romanian football league system. The season began on 7 September 2019 and was scheduled to end in June 2020, but was suspended in March because of the COVID-19 pandemic in Romania.

AJF Sibiu (County Football Association) announced that a promotion play-off tournament between the first 3 ranked teams will be played to decide the county champion and the team that will qualify for the promotion play-off to Liga III. After Avrig decided to withdraw, the season was ended on 26 July after a play-off match between Măgura Cisnădie and Păltiniș Rășinari.

Team changes

To Liga IV Sibiu
Relegated from Liga III
 —

Promoted from Liga V Sibiu
 Vulturul Poplaca
 Fraternitas Tălmaciu
 Athletic Șura Mare
 Leii Șura Mică

From Liga IV Sibiu
Promoted to Liga III
 Viitorul Șelimbăr

Relegated to Liga V Sibiu
 —

Other changes
 Avrig withdrew from Liga III after the end of the last season and was enrolled instead in the Liga IV, a move made due to financial reasons.
 Copșa Mică and Interstar Sibiu withdrew from Liga IV.
 Viitorul Șelimbăr II was enrolled in Liga IV on demand.

League table

Championship play-off

Măgura Cisnădie won the 2019–20 Liga IV Sibiu and qualify for promotion play-off to Liga III.

Promotion play-off

Champions of Liga IV – Sibiu County face champions of Liga IV – Covasna County and Liga IV – Mureș County.

Region 3 (Center)

Group A

See also

Main Leagues
 2019–20 Liga I
 2019–20 Liga II
 2019–20 Liga III
 2019–20 Liga IV

County Leagues (Liga IV series)

 2019–20 Liga IV Alba
 2019–20 Liga IV Arad
 2019–20 Liga IV Argeș
 2019–20 Liga IV Bacău
 2019–20 Liga IV Bihor
 2019–20 Liga IV Bistrița-Năsăud
 2019–20 Liga IV Botoșani
 2019–20 Liga IV Brăila
 2019–20 Liga IV Brașov
 2019–20 Liga IV Bucharest
 2019–20 Liga IV Buzău
 2019–20 Liga IV Călărași
 2019–20 Liga IV Caraș-Severin
 2019–20 Liga IV Cluj
 2019–20 Liga IV Constanța
 2019–20 Liga IV Covasna
 2019–20 Liga IV Dâmbovița
 2019–20 Liga IV Dolj
 2019–20 Liga IV Galați
 2019–20 Liga IV Giurgiu
 2019–20 Liga IV Gorj
 2019–20 Liga IV Harghita
 2019–20 Liga IV Hunedoara
 2019–20 Liga IV Ialomița
 2019–20 Liga IV Iași
 2019–20 Liga IV Ilfov
 2019–20 Liga IV Maramureș
 2019–20 Liga IV Mehedinți
 2019–20 Liga IV Mureș
 2019–20 Liga IV Neamț
 2019–20 Liga IV Olt
 2019–20 Liga IV Prahova
 2019–20 Liga IV Sălaj
 2019–20 Liga IV Satu Mare
 2019–20 Liga IV Suceava
 2019–20 Liga IV Teleorman
 2019–20 Liga IV Timiș
 2019–20 Liga IV Tulcea
 2019–20 Liga IV Vâlcea
 2019–20 Liga IV Vaslui
 2019–20 Liga IV Vrancea

References

External links
 AJF Sibiu 

Liga IV seasons
Sport in Sibiu County